The Scotland national under-18 football team is the national football team representing Scotland for players of 18 years of age or under at the start of a denoted campaign. The team, which is controlled by the Scottish Football Association, acts as a feeder team to the Scotland national football team.

History
Scotland's best performance at a European Championship Finals occurred in 1982, when they won the tournament. The team was then managed by Andy Roxburgh and Walter Smith, who would both go on to manage the senior side. Scotland defeated rivals England in the qualifying round and finished top of Group 4, which also included the Netherlands. Scotland beat Poland 2–0 in the semi-finals and Czechoslovakia 3–1 in the final.

Scotland reached the semi-finals on seven other occasions. Scotland hosted the 1970 tournament, where they won a group containing Bulgaria, Sweden and Italy, but then lost 1–0 to Netherlands in the semi-final. In the 1978 tournament, hosted by Poland, Scotland topped a group containing Germany and Italy to qualify for the semi-final, where they lost on penalties to Yugoslavia.

The age group of the competition was adjusted upwards by one year for the 2002 tournament, with Scotland entering an under-19 team from then on. The Scotland under-18 team consequently fell into abeyance, aside from sporadic friendly matches including double-headers against Serbia in April 2012, Israel in April 2013 and the Czech Republic in October 2014.

In 2018, recognising a gap in progression for the best players of the relevant age (several of whom were Performance School participants fast-tracked into the under-17s but not ready for the step up to under-19s), the SFA announced that the under-18 team would be re-established to offer more match experience as part of the same group.

Coaches
 2018: Billy Stark

Competitive record
 Champions   Runners-up   Third place / semi finals    Fourth place   Tournament held on home soil

UEFA European U-18 Championship Record
 1948–1954 – FIFA Youth Tournament
 1955–1980 – UEFA Youth Tournament
 1981–2001 –  UEFA European U-18 Championship

Notes
First qualifying round and Preliminary round are the same stage
Elite round, Intermediary round and Second qualifying round are the same stage
Draws also include penalty shootouts, regardless of the outcome.

Other tournaments

Current squad 
The following players were selected for two friendlies against Wales in March 2023.

References 

European national under-18 association football teams
F